Khin Maung Win may refer to:
Khin Maung Win (mathematician) (1940–2021), Burmese writer and professor at Yangon University
Khin Maung Win (physician) (born 1949), Burmese hepatologist, writer and businessman
Khin Maung Win (politician, born 1955), House of Nationalities MP for Tanintharyi
Khin Maung Win (politician, born 1958), Amyotha Hluttaw MP for Sagaing